John Maxwell Batten (28 February 1853 – 15 October 1917) was a rugby union fullback who played club rugby for Cambridge University and international rugby for England.

Personal life
Batten was born in 1848, in Almora, India, the second son of John Hallet Batten a member of the Indian Civil Service. Batten was educated at Haileybury School, before matriculating to St John's College, Cambridge in 1871. He received his BA (1st class) in 1875, becoming an Assistant Master at his old Secondary School, Haileybury. He left his post at Haileybury in 1877 and took up a similar role at Kelly College in Tavistock, Devon from 1877 to 1882; and then at Newton Abbott, 1883-1884. In 1884 he became the headmaster of Plymouth College, a position he held until 1889.

Rugby career
Batten first came to note as a rugby player when he represented Cambridge University while at St John's College. He won four sporting 'Blues' for rugby, and his first was in the very first Varsity Match between Cambridge and Oxford in 1872. Cambridge lost the first match, but Batten played in the next year's encounter and scored one of three tries in Cambridge's first Varsity Match victory. Batten played in both the 1874 and the 1875 matches, and was given the captaincy of the Cambridge team, both games ended in draws.

Batten won his first and only international cap for England in 1874. The game was played against Scotland in the third encounter between the two teams, and only the third international rugby union game to be played. Batten was positioned in his usual role as fullback, and although England won narrowly, he was replaced for the next season's match by A.W. Pearson.

References

Bibliography
 

1853 births
1917 deaths
English rugby union players
England international rugby union players
Cambridge University R.U.F.C. players
Rugby union fullbacks
People educated at Haileybury and Imperial Service College
Alumni of St John's College, Cambridge
People from Almora